Kitty Petrine Fredriksen (10 January 1910 – 3 March 2003) was a Norwegian politician for the Liberal Party.

She served as a deputy representative to the Norwegian Parliament from Troms during the terms 1945–1949 and 1950–1953.

References

1910 births
2003 deaths
Deputy members of the Storting
Troms politicians
Liberal Party (Norway) politicians
Women members of the Storting
20th-century Norwegian women politicians
20th-century Norwegian politicians